Ophthalmotilapia boops is a species of fish in the cichlid endemic to Lake Tanganyika where it is only known from along the southern shore of the lake.  It can reach a length of  TL.  It can also be found in the aquarium trade.

References

boops
Fish described in 1901
Taxonomy articles created by Polbot